Villa Nova is an unincorporated community in Saint Marys Township, Auglaize County, Ohio, United States.

References

Unincorporated communities in Auglaize County, Ohio